Disconeura lutosa is a moth of the family Erebidae first described by Jacob Hübner in 1823. It is found in Paraguay and Brazil.

Subspecies
Disconeura lutosa lutosa
Disconeura lutosa frater (Rothschild, 1922) (Brazil)

References

Phaegopterina
Moths described in 1823